Spafax is an international travel media network. They provide content technology and media assets at scale for airlines along with licensing rights to movies, TV, audio, and video games for use in airline in-flight entertainment (IFE) systems.

Spafax was founded in London in 1985 and is now part of WPP Group PLC, in the Specialist Communications & PR division with over a dozen offices around the world.

History

Spafax started as Bath Spa Factors in Bath, England in the 1930s as a garage servicing Rolls-Royce and Bentley cars. From there, they evolved into a parts distributor with a European network. In order to communicate with the sales force, Bath Spa Factors decided to take advantage of Betamax to create films with local talents, from there a film division was born. Spafax Television was one of the earliest customized programme producers that built up a blue chip client base that included the likes of Reuters and Marconi. And then, Duncan Hilleary, one of Spafax's earliest contributors, arrived on the scene in 1986 and pitched a plan for an airline network.

He and filmmaker Jeremy Hunter partnered with the newly named Spafax Airline Network resulted in a contract to produce advertising and video productions for British Airways. The video production, a monthly magazine-style program called The World Traveler Show featuring different locations around the world, led to contracts with different airlines, including Singapore and Northwest.

In 1993, Hilleary pioneered the outsourcing of in-flight entertainment to British Airways (BA) with a dedicated team located in a BA office in Buckingham Palace Road and re-launched BA's IFE with a new programming strategy, a new graphic identity and media brand. This new approach was also one of the first to offer tangible benefits to the airline in the form of substantial savings against the BA  (IFE) budget. From 1995 to 2004, Spafax has expanded to Canada, Asia, South America, and the United Arab Emirates. Spafax now has 8 offices worldwide from London to Dubai.

Operations
Spafax office locations:

 London
 Montreal
 Toronto
 Santiago
 Orange County
Los Angeles (The Hub)
 Dubai
 Singapore
Hong Kong
Beijing
 Frankfurt
 New York City
Madrid

Services

Publishing
Part of Spafax's services include publishing with a specialization in custom publishing.

Entertainment
Spafax's main clients are airlines, which started the company. They offer custom in-flight entertainment and branding services to their clients; from publishing to in-flight entertainment media.

Media sales
Advertising and media sales is part of Spafax's services. This aspect of their service is created to sell advertising.

Other services 
In lieu of current trends and digital development, customized digital branding is a part of the services offered by Spafax division, Spafax Studio.

References

Marketing companies of the United Kingdom
British companies established in 1985
Marketing companies established in 1985